Kidosht (also Romanized as Kīdosht, Kaidasht, and Keydasht; also known as Kadāsh) is a village in Momenabad Rural District, in the Central District of Sarbisheh County, South Khorasan Province, Iran. At the 2006 census, its population was 56, in 15 families.

References 

Populated places in Sarbisheh County